Samuel David Simmonds (born 10 November 1994) is an English professional rugby union player who plays as a back row forward for Premiership Rugby side Exeter Chiefs.  After graduating through their academy, Simmonds made his Exeter Chiefs debut in November 2012.

Early life
Simmonds was born in Torquay and grew up in Teignmouth, Devon playing for local club Teignmouth RFC in his youth. His father and uncle are both in the fishing industry. As a child, he wanted to be a footballer, but after earning selection to play rugby for Devon aged fourteen, he switched his focus to it.

His younger brother, Joe Simmonds, also plays rugby union for Exeter Chiefs and has represented England at youth levels as a fly-half.

At age 18 Simmonds weighed about 85 kg.

Club career
Simmonds came through the Exeter Chiefs academy, making his debut for the senior side in an Anglo-Welsh Cup game against London Welsh in November 2012. In February 2017, Simmonds played his first Premiership match for Exeter Chiefs against Wasps, earning the player of the Match award. In the 2017 Premiership semi-final against Saracens, Simmonds came on as a replacement when Chiefs were down three points towards the end of the game, scoring the winning try from a driving maul. He then featured again as a replacement in the final as Exeter defeated Wasps  to be crowned champions of England for the first time in their history.

Simmonds scored a try in the 2020 European Rugby Champions Cup Final as Exeter defeated Racing to become champions of Europe for the first time. The following weekend saw Exeter overcome Wasps in the Premiership final to complete a league and European double. At the end of this season Simmonds was named European Player of the Year. He became the seventh Englishman to receive the 'Anthony Foley Memorial Trophy’, following in the footsteps of Jonny Wilkinson (2013), Steffon Armitage (2014), Nick Abendanon (2015), Maro Itoje (2016), Owen Farrell (2018) and Alex Goode (2019).

On 20 November 2020 Exeter opened the new Premiership season away at Harlequins, winning 33–3, with Simmonds scoring three tries – including an outstanding long-range effort – and taking the ‘man-of-the-match’ award. In doing so, he took his try tally in the Premiership to 34 in 49 games – and 47 in 70 games for Chiefs overall. By the end of 2020, Simmonds had scored eight tries in the four Premiership games Chiefs had played, and also scored a try in the Champions Cup game against Glasgow Warriors. During the Chiefs' match against London Irish on 18 May, Simmonds scored his 17th try of the season to draw level with the Premiership try-scoring record, before scoring his 18th and 19th tries of the season.

International career

England
In October 2017 Simmonds received his first call-up to the senior England squad by coach Eddie Jones for the 2017 Autumn Internationals. On 11 November 2017 Simmonds made his debut against  in 21–8 win at Twickenham. Later in the autumn series he made his first start against Samoa.

With Billy Vunipola and Nathan Hughes, Eddie Jones' first and second choice at No.8, unavailable through injury, Simmonds was called up to the England squad for the 2018 Six Nations Championship. He started in England's first match of the tournament against Italy, and scored two tries to help England to a 46–15 victory in Rome. In September 2021 after more than three years without playing for England Simmonds was recalled for the autumn International Series. He came off the bench in victories over Australia and South Africa.

British and Irish Lions
On 6 May 2021, Simmonds was named in the squad for the 2021 British & Irish Lions tour to South Africa. His one Test appearance came as a second-half replacement for Jack Conan in the final game of the series as the Lions suffered a narrow defeat.

International tries

Honours
Exeter
 European Rugby Champions Cup: 2019–2020
 Premiership: 2016–17, 2019–20

Individual
 European Player of the Year: 2019–20

References

External links

Career stats at Statbunker

1994 births
Living people
English rugby union players
Rugby union flankers
Rugby union number eights
Exeter Chiefs players
Cornish Pirates players
Plymouth Albion R.F.C. players
Rugby union players from Torquay
England international rugby union players
British & Irish Lions rugby union players from England